Victor de la Cruz Ocampo (March 16, 1952 – March 16, 2023) was a Filipino bishop of the Roman Catholic Church. He served as the Bishop of Gumaca from 2015 until his death.

Ministry

Priesthood
Ocampo attended Holy Family Academy in Angeles City and the Mother of Good Counsel Minor Seminary. He then studied philosophy and Catholic theology at the San Jose Seminary in Quezon City. On November 5, 1977, he received the sacrament of ordination for the Diocese of Balanga.

Ocampo first served as parish vicar at St. Joseph Cathedral in Balanga before becoming parish priest of Our Lady and the Pillar in Morong in 1979. He later served as parish priest of the parishes of St. Catherine of Alexandria in Bagac (1981-1986), St. Francis of Assisi in Limay (1986-1991) and Our Lady of Lourdes in Colo, a barangay of Dinalupihan (1996-1997). From 1996 to 1997, Ocampo was parish vicar of the parish of Holy Rosary in Orani and from 1997 to 2002 again at the Cathedral of St. Joseph in Balanga. He then served as pastor of the parishes of Holy Rosary in Orani (2002–2007) and St. Michael in Orion (2007–2010). In 2008, he was pastor of the parish of St. Dominic de Guzman in Balanga.

In addition to his pastoral work, Ocampo headed the diocesan office for catechesis (1978–2002), the diocesan liturgical commission (2007–2008), and from 2008 the commission for family and life. From 1986 he was also responsible for the Bible apostolate in the Diocese of Balanga. In addition, Ocampo served as Regional Vicar from 1983 to 1986 and as Chancellor of the Curia from 2008. On November 18, 1993, Pope John Paul II bestowed on him the honorary title of Honorary Papal Chaplain. 

With the departure of Socrates Villegas to serve as archbishop of Lingayen-Dagupan in Pangasinan on November 4, 2009 which ended his term as bishop of Balanga, Ocampo was designated as the diocesan administrator of the Diocese of Balanga where he held that position until Villegas' successor Ruperto Santos became the diocese's fourth and current bishop on July 8, 2010. In 2013, he was a member of the council of consultors of the Diocese of Balanga.

Bishop
On June 12, 2015, Pope Francis appointed Ocampo Bishop of Gumaca. The Archbishop of Manila, Luis Antonio Tagle, consecrated him on August 29 of the same year in the Cathedral of St. Joseph in Balanga; Co-consecrators were the Apostolic Nuncio to the Philippines, Archbishop Giuseppe Pinto, and the Bishop of Balanga, Ruperto Santos. His motto Corpus meum (“My body”) comes from the consecration of the Eucharistic prayer. The inauguration took place on September 3, 2015.

In the Catholic Bishops' Conference of the Philippines, Ocampo was also a member of the permanent council from 2017 to 2019 and represented the south-east of the island of Luzon. He was also a member of the commissions for the laity and for the biblical apostolate.

Death
Ocampo died of a heart attack at a Gumaca hospital, on March 16, 2023, his 71st birthday.

References

External links
Victor Ocampo at Catholic Hierarchy

1952 births
2023 deaths
21st-century Roman Catholic bishops in the Philippines
People from Angeles City
Bishops appointed by Pope Francis